is a private university in Sendai, Miyagi, Japan, established in 1999. The predecessor of the school was founded in 1978.

External links
 Official website 

Educational institutions established in 1978
Private universities and colleges in Japan
Universities and colleges in Miyagi Prefecture
Buildings and structures in Sendai